Graham Anthony Newdick (11 January 1949 – 25 August 2020) was a New Zealand cricketer who played first-class cricket for Wellington between 1970 and 1981.

An opening batsman, Newdick's most successful season was his first, in 1970–71. He scored 404 runs in the Plunket Shield at an average of 50.50, forming a productive opening partnership for Wellington with Bruce Murray, and hitting his highest score, 143 against Auckland. He was a consistent run-scorer for Wellington for the rest of his career. He also represented Hutt Valley in the Hawke Cup from 1968 to 1984. 

Newdick worked in the construction industry, running his own companies and later playing a leading part in the construction apprenticeship body, BCITO. He was also the cricket coach at Wellington College, Wellington, and St Patrick's College, Silverstream, in Upper Hutt. He moved to England a year before his death.

References

External links
 
 

1949 births
2020 deaths
Cricketers from Lower Hutt
New Zealand cricketers
Wellington cricketers
New Zealand cricket coaches
New Zealand businesspeople